Christ Church Foundation School is a school in Christ Church, Barbados, founded in 1809. The school is situated on an elevation near the southern tip of the island overlooking the sea. It is a co-educational sixth form government secondary school.

It consists of five science laboratories, two computer labs, a business room, two music rooms, three art rooms, two home economics rooms, an electricity lab, a general studies room, a foreign language room, a mathematics room, a language arts room, a technical drawing room, a wood workshop, a metal workshop, a theatre arts room, a physical education office, a library, 27 classrooms, a guidance office, a deputy principal's office, an assembly hall, two staff rooms, and an administration block comprising the principal's office and the secretary-treasurer's office.

There is a school canteen (operated by a concessionaire) which provides lunches daily.

The school operates on a 7 or 8 period day, beginning at 8:35 am and ending at 2:40 pm. The school year is from September to July and consists of three terms - Michaelmas term of 14 weeks, Hilary term of 12 weeks, and Trinity term of 12 weeks. The terms are separated by holiday periods of three weeks (Christmas), three weeks (Easter), and eight weeks (Summer).

Curriculum
At Foundation School, students are prepared for the Caribbean Secondary Education Certificate Examination (CSEC) and the Caribbean Advance Proficiency Examinations (CAPE) of the Caribbean Examination Council (CXC).

CSEC subjects
English
Mathematics
Information Technology
French
Spanish
Mechanical Engineering (Metal Work)
 Building Technology (Wood Work)
 Building and Mechanical Drawing (Technical Drawing)
History
Geography
Physics
Chemistry
Biology
Integrated Science
Electrical and Electronic Technology
Social Studies
Music
Religious Studies
Art
Health and Family Life Education
 Principles of Business
 Principles of Accounting
Office Administration
 Electronic Document Preparation and Management
Food and Nutrition
Physical Education

CAPE subjects
Mathematics
English
Geography
Computer Science
Management of Business
Accounting
Physics
Chemistry
Biology
Environmental Science
Communication Studies
Caribbean Studies

History

In the minute book of the committee of management of the Christ Church Foundation School for 1832, there was a copy of a memorandum dated 10 July 1809. It was found under the foundation stone of the original school buildings from that time. It stated that the school building was erected with the aid of subscriptions for the purpose of a school for the poor white children of the Parish. The school was to be supported by the rent of land and a donation from Francis Williams, Esquire. The endowment was not coming from Francis Williams but from his dead brother, Captain John Williams who in his will had bequeathed 100 acres of land and 300 pounds to be used for the establishment of the school. Francis inherited from John and, instead of giving both the land and the money to the school, he gave only the land. In the will of Francis Williams, he expressly stated that the school was intended for the education of boys primarily. Any funding would be given to the boys' school, with the girls receiving whatever was left over. Boys would be educated in the front building and the girls, housed in a building at the rear between the headmaster's quarters and the church wall. The ratio of boys to girls attending the school was set at 2:1.

Reverend Dr. Thomas Harrison Orderson, who was rector of Christ Church Parish Church from 1803 assisted greatly in getting the school started and called some of his Lodge School teachers and asked them to teach at Foundation. Many of Foundation's founding partners were from the Lodge school, including some of Foundation's headmasters.

The foundation stone for The Parochial School, as it was called, was laid on July 10, 1809, by The Honorable John Spooner, President of His Majesty's Council in the Island and Commander-in-chief. The land which John had left for the school was rented as directed by the will. Funds received from its rental were given to the school. It was also used to pay for scholarships, which allowed poor people to attend Foundation.

The school was destroyed by a hurricane on the 11th of August, 1831, and, along with the church, was relocated to the Fort in Oistins, now known as Christ Church District Hospital.

At the time Bishop Coleridge recommended building a separate school for the girls when the boys' school was rebuilt. Provision was therefore made for 12 girls to be admitted to the school.

The first stone for the foundation for the new building was laid on June 1, 1832, by his Excellency, Sir James Lyon, Governor and Commander-in-chief of the island. The new building was built using funds given to the government for the construction of schools on the island. The school was opened on September 19, 1832, with 30 boarders, 18 boys and 12 girls, along with 15 daytime-only students, 8 boys and 7 girls. Lunch consisted of six white biscuits and a glass of syrup. Dinner, dependent on the day of the week consisted of soup, fresh fish, meat, and rice. The daily expense of running the school was provided through the close ties it had with the nearby church. Money was collected from rents, sacramental money, sermons and contributions from the vestry.

On July 10, 1894, the Legislature passed an Act called "The Christ Church Foundation Act". The Act gave land around the island and buildings to the school. A committee was appointed to see after it. The Act removed the "white" color requirement for entrance into the school. As the school continued to grow, more room was required, so in 1898 the committee bought a neighboring house for the girls' school while the boys remained in the current location. The school thus became two separate entities - the Christ Church Boys Foundation School and the Christ Church Girls Foundation School.

1906 saw a momentous change in the school structure. Prior to this date, the school was looked on as a primary or middle school. Teaching only reading, writing and arithmetic along with some religious teaching to children between 7 and 14 years old. After hard work by a man named Samuel Kirton, and despite opposition from the wealthy planters, the school was upgraded to the status of a second grade (Secondary) school. In then taught Languages, Algebra, Geometry, History, and Geography. The age of the students was extended from 14 to 16 and persons wishing to go to Foundation had to pass an entrance examination.

In 1928, the school was officially recognized which allowed the school to receive annual grants from the Government. Miss Bradshaw was the head mistress of the girls' school. The school once again out grew its confines and permission was granted by Canon Farrar, Rector of the parish for the school to use the Memorial School building. The Memorial school at that time housed a mixed primary school. It outgrew itself once more and Miss Bradshaw added another large room to the plant.

During 1945, Mr. Howard Hayden Director of Education at the time tried to repeal the 1906 act and proposed that the two schools be joined into one. This proposal was opposed by most of the teaching staff, as well as those who had known about the poor treatment of the school by the leaders of the country. The shabby treatment of the girls' school was an especially sore point. However constant pressure by Government caused them to change their minds.

Around this time the land which was left to the school by Francis Williams was sold by Government and renamed Parish Land. Samuel Kirton died and left money to pay for persons who have won scholarships to go to Foundation. The first head boy, Frank Broome, was appointed.

In 1957, a new building was proposed to be constructed by Miss Gwilliam of the Colonial Office. The cost of $442,100 was collected from the Colonial Office and Welfare departments. The school was opened on January 14, 1957. On February 16, 1960, the school was visited by Her Royal Highness The Princess Royal, who unveiled a plaque commemorating the newly built school.

The new building, constructed in 1957, was built on a new foundation. The previous generations of Foundation Boys' School was constructed on the land where Christ Church High School, which had closed, used to be. The land is currently being occupied by a community centre which was constructed by the parish church. The previous generations of the Girls' School were situated in a small building, on the pasture by the current school's west gate.

Although occupying the same land and, for the first time, the same building, the school still existed as the Christ Church Foundation Girls' School and the Christ Church Foundation Boys' School. Girls were not allowed on the boys' side and boys were not allowed on the girls' side. The two schools had separate Heads, Deputy Heads and teaching staff. They also had different eating areas and a separate canteen. There were some classes the girls took, (mainly science) which were done over on the boys side, but these were very few.

In September, 1978, the amalgamation process was started. New female students who had passed to Foundation were admitted into the boys side and shared classrooms with boys who had similarly passed for Foundation that year. The remainder of the school remained single sex. The following year the batch of mixed first formers were promoted into second form and a new set of mixed students entered first form. During this time no one was admitted to the girls' school and that school composed only students who had gained entry prior to 1978. Thus, at the end of the school year in July 1982, the entire school was mixed and the Foundation Boys' and Girls' Schools no longer existed. The resulting school was called Christ Church Foundation School.

After the merger began, the Acting Headmistress of the Girls' school, Mrs. Beryl Sealy, resigned and Mrs. Ruby St. John took over the running of the school until it was finally closed in 1982. The Headmaster of the Boys' school and his Deputy were transferred to the corresponding posts at the amalgamated Foundation School. In 1983 the school began to take in their first batch of mixed-gender students including Maryann Redman, Current President of the Barbados Secondary Teachers Union and Alison Hinds and then soon after that other mixed-gender students were taken in and then they later became a permanent part of the school's  student role both boys and girls alike.

References

http://www.totallybarbados.com

External links
Website

Schools in Barbados
Christ Church, Barbados
Education in Barbados
Educational organisations based in Barbados
Educational institutions established in 1809